4 Dollars of Revenge is a 1966 Spanish-Italian action western film directed by Alfonso Balcázar and Jaime Jesús Balcázar, written by Bruno Corbucci, Aldo Grimaldi and Giovanni Grimaldi and starring Robert Woods, Dana Ghia, Antonio Casas, Angelo Infanti and Gérard Tichy.

Cast

References

External links
 

1966 films
Spanish Western (genre) films
Italian Western (genre) films
Spaghetti Western films
1966 Western (genre) films
Films directed by Alfonso Balcázar
Films with screenplays by Bruno Corbucci
Films with screenplays by Aldo Grimaldi
Films with screenplays by Giovanni Grimaldi
Films scored by Benedetto Ghiglia
Films scored by Angelo Francesco Lavagnino
Films shot in Barcelona
Films shot in Rome
1960s Italian films